Milarepa is considered one of Tibet's most famous yogis and poets.

Milarepa may also refer to:

 Milarepa (1974 film), a 1974 Italian film
 Milarepa (2006 film), a 2006 Tibetan film
 Milarepa Fund

See also
 Milarepa's Cave (disambiguation)